FC Energetik is a Turkmen association football club based in the Türkmenbaşy village, Mary Province. Founded in 2015, club played its first-ever top flight season in 2015. The club reached third position in 2016, their highest achievement.

Name history
2010 : Founded as Kuwwat
2014 : Renamed  Mary GES
2015 : Renamed  Energetik

History
The team was established in 2010 as FC Kuwwat. In 2010–2014 served among amateur teams in the first division of Turkmenistan under coach Arseniý Ýüzbaşýan. In 2014 the team won the Turkmenistan First League, and won the right to participate in the Ýokary Liga. In 2015 the club changed its name to FC Energetik and received the status of a professional. With the new season the club was headed Rahym Kurbanmämmedow, help him in his work with a team Aleksandr Klimenko and Dmitriý Hasanow. The debut game in the 2015 Ýokary Liga held on 6 March 2015, FC Energetik was defeated by FC Ahal (0:6).

Manager history

Honours

Domestic
 Ýokary Liga 
 3rd place : 2016, 2018
 Turkmenistan Cup 
 Winner : —
 Finalist : 2018

References

Football clubs in Turkmenistan
2010 establishments in Turkmenistan